Michael Anderson may refer to:

Sport 
 Michael Anderson Pereira da Silva (born 1983), Brazilian footballer better known simply as Michael
 Michael Anderson (basketball) (born 1966), American basketball player
 Michael Anderson (cricketer, born 1960), cricketer for Northumberland
 Michael Anderson (cricketer, born 1916) (1916–1940), first-class cricketer
 Michael Anderson (swimmer) (born 1987), Australian Paralympian
 Mikey Anderson, American ice hockey player

Music 
 Michael Anderson (Building 429 drummer), Christian rock band drummer
 Michael Anderson (Altered Images drummer), Scottish New Wave/post-punk band drummer

Other 
 Ghillar Michael Anderson (born 1951), Australian Aboriginal elder, namesake of asteroid 10040 Ghillar
 Michael Anderson Jr. (born 1943), British actor, son of Michael Anderson (director)
 Michael T. Anderson (born 1950), American mathematician
 Michael Anderson (director) (1920–2018), British film director
 Michael J. Anderson (born 1953), American actor, small person
 Michael John Anderson (born 1988), convicted of murder in 2009
 Michael P. Anderson (1959–2003), African-American astronaut killed in the Space Shuttle Columbia disaster in 2003
 Michael Anderson (historian), economic historian

See also 
 Michael Andersson (disambiguation)
 Mikael Andersson (disambiguation)
 Mike Anderson (disambiguation)